The following is a list of episodes of the Norwegian situation comedy Karl & Co. The series consisted of 63 episodes which were first broadcast between 1998 and 2001.

Season 1: 1998

Season 2: 1999-2000

Season 3: 2000-2001

Karl and Co